Fodé Doucouré (born 3 February 2001) is a Malian professional footballer who plays as a right-back for French  club Red Star.

Career
On 11 July 2019, Doucouré signed a professional contract with Reims. He made his professional debut with Reims in a 4–0 Ligue 1 win over Montpellier on 25 October 2020.

On 10 January 2022, he joined Red Star on loan until the end of the season. On 25 July 2022, Doucouré returned to Red Star on a permanent basis.

References

External links
 
 JMG Profile

2001 births
Living people
Sportspeople from Bamako
Malian footballers
Association football fullbacks
Stade de Reims players
Red Star F.C. players
Ligue 1 players
Championnat National 2 players
Malian expatriate footballers
Malian expatriate sportspeople in France
Expatriate footballers in France
21st-century Malian people